Mathieu Beaudoin (born April 6, 1984) is a Canadian former professional ice hockey right wing who played predominantly in the American Hockey League (AHL).

On July 3, 2010 Beaudoin was signed as a free agent to a one-year contract by the NHL's Phoenix Coyotes, he was later reassigned to AHL affiliate, the San Antonio Rampage for the 2010–11 season.

Beaudoin signed a one-year deal with the Hershey Bears of the AHL on July 3, 2012. During the 2012–13 season, Beaudoin was traded by the Bears to the Rockford IceHogs as part of future considerations in a NHL trade between Affiliates, the Chicago Blackhawks and the Washington Capitals for Peter LeBlanc on January 31, 2013.

Career statistics

References

External links

1984 births
Arizona Sundogs players
Bolzano HC players
Hershey Bears players
Houston Aeros (1994–2013) players
Ice hockey people from Quebec
Iowa Stars players
Las Vegas Wranglers players
Living people
Milwaukee Admirals players
Ohio State University alumni
Portland Pirates players
Rochester Americans players
Rockford IceHogs (AHL) players
San Antonio Rampage players
Sportspeople from Sherbrooke
Texas Stars players
Canadian ice hockey right wingers